Bolotovo is a rural locality (a village) in Markovskoye Rural Settlement, Vologodsky District, Vologda Oblast, Russia. The population was 11 as of 2002.

Geography 
Bolotovo is located 26 km southeast of Vologda (the district's administrative centre) by road. Tishinovo is the nearest rural locality.

References 

Rural localities in Vologodsky District